Chinese Farm, subtitled "Egyptian-Israeli Combat in the '73 War", is a board wargame published by Simulations Publications, Inc. (SPI) in 1975 that simulates operational level ground combat between Egypt and Israel at the Battle of The Chinese Farm during the just completed Yom Kippur War of October 1973. Chinese Farm was originally published as part of the "quadrigame" Modern Battles: Four Contemporary Conflicts.

Description
During the Arab-Israeli War of October 1973, Israeli forces opened a bridgehead over the Suez Canal to exploit a perceived gap in the Egyptian line, and instead ran up against a strong force. The battle took place in the vicinity of an Egyptian experimental farm that used Japanese equipment. Israeli observers mistook the Japanese Kanji characters on the  machinery for Chinese Hanzi, leading to the misnomer "The Chinese Farm". Chinese Farm is one of four games in the series Modern Warfare published by SPI that serves as an introduction to wargaming.

Components
The game includes:
 folio to hold game components
 17" x 22" paper hex grid map scaled at 1 mile (1.6 km) per hex
 100 counters
 rulebook
 player aids
 six-sided die

Scenarios
The game includes three scenarios:
 An short introductory scenario that is only seven turns and includes only ground combat.
 The complete historical scenario is 12 turns long, and includes Israeli air support and Egyptian SAM missiles.
 A theoretical and not historically accurate scenario that asks what would have happened if the Egyptians had established better defenses on their side of the Suez Canal.

Victory conditions
The Israeli player receives game points for geographical gains, while the Egyptian players earns them for eliminating Israeli units. Whoever earns the most points wins the game.

Publication history
SPI published the game Modern Battles: Four Contemporary Conflicts in 1975 using the "quadrigame" concept that SPI had pioneered earlier in 1975 with Blue & Gray: Four American Civil War Battles: a game that contained a single set of rules, but with counters and maps for four different battles. Similarly the box for Modern Battles contained one set of rules for four different battles, including Golan, Wurzburg, Mukden, and Chinese Farm, the latter designed by Howard Barasch, with cartography and graphic design by Redmond A. Simonsen. SPI also released the four games individually as the Modern Warfare series of "folio games", the components contained in a cardstock folder packaged in a plastic bag. Each individual game was also released as a "Collector's Edition" with mounted maps in a 2" accordion box.  

In 1979, Hobby Japan published a licensed Japanese-language version.

Reception
In Issue 24 of Moves (December 1975), Ed Carran noted that "The game mechanics are moderately complex, but once assimilated, they become second nature." He concluded that "Observation of even one Game-Tum [...] shows that a fair amount of calculation goes into each combat."  

In Issue 55 of Moves, Ian Chadwick noted "It's not a question of whether or not the Israelis will cross the canal, but how well they do so." He concluded by calling it "a very playable game [...] fast and enjoyable", and gave it an A for playability, a C for component quality, and a C for historical accuracy.

In his 1977 book The Comprehensive Guide to Board Wargaming, Nicholas Palmer noted that the Combat Results Table (CRT) "is unsuited to cross-canal actions."

Other reviews
Close Up: SPI's Chinese Farm and Golan, by Warren G. Williams, in Fire & Movement #2, 1976
Spotlight: Games of the Arab Israeli Wars, by Keith Poulter, in Wargamer Vol.1 #2, 1977
SPI's Modern Battles, by Donald Mack, in Wargamer Vol.1 #13
American Wargamer Vol. 3, No. 7
Simulacrum #20

References

Other sources 
Elusive Victory: The Arab-Israeli Wars, 1947-1974, by Trevor N. Dupuy, Harper and Row, New York, 1978
On the Banks of the Suez, by Avraham Adan, Presidio Press, 1991
Arabs at War: Military Effectiveness 1948-1991, by Kenneth M. Pollack, University of Nebraska Press, Lincoln, Nebraska, 2002
Crossing of the Suez, The, by Lt. General Saad El Shazly, American Mideast Research, revised English edition, 2003

External links 
 
 Chinese Farm at Web-Grognards

Board games introduced in 1975
Simulations Publications games
Wargames introduced in 1975
Yom Kippur War board wargames